Sheena Wright (born January 6, 1970) is an American nonprofit executive who is the first woman president of the United Way of New York City. In August 2021, she was tapped as the chair of New York City mayor-elect Eric Adams' transition team. On December 20, 2021, it was announced that she would be the Deputy Mayor of Strategic Initiatives in the Adams administration. Despite multiple arrests and previous federal investigations, Wright was named First Deputy Mayor by Eric Adams on December 6, 2022 and began in January 2023.

Biography 
Wright is a native of The Bronx. She was educated at the George School in Pennsylvania. She then enrolled at Columbia University at age 16 and was a member of the school's varsity track and field team. She graduated from Columbia College in 1990 and Columbia Law School in 1994. She is presently a trustee of her alma mater, a position she was elected to in March 2021.

After graduation from law school, Wright worked as a lawyer for Wachtell, Lipton, Rosen & Katz, in private equity firms and served as general counsel for Crave Technologies, a minority-owned software startup.

Wright served as president and executive director of the Abyssinian Development Corporation, the economic arm of the influential Abyssinian Baptist Church in Harlem. On April 1, 2013, Wright was subpoenaed to speak with Federal prosecutors about her tenure at Abyssinian because of the sale of a townhouse intended for buyers making less than $130,000 to Todd Hunter, son of NBA union executive Billy Hunter, through an Abyssinian subsidiary while Wright was leading the organization. Wright's tenure as CEO and President at Abyssinian has been described in an unflattering light by former employees who note over $500,000 spent on team-building, leadership events and conferences that these employees describe as "junkets or vacations for favored senior staff" to Martha's Vineyard, the Bahamas, and Jamaica. 

On the day Hurricane Sandy hit in 2012, she became the first female head of the United Way of New York City in the organization's 79-year history. As president and CEO of United Way, she has been involved in Hurricane Sandy and Covid-19 relief work. She also led the ReadNYC initiative to support child literacy.

In August 2021, she was named by Eric Adams to lead the mayoral candidate's transition team.

Personal life 
Wright's mother, Debra Fraser-Howze, is a noted AIDS activist who founded, and served as the CEO and President of the National Black Leadership Commission on AIDS. She also founded the Choose Healthy Life, a network of 120 churches in 13 jurisdictions across the United States providing coronavirus testing and administering vaccines. Her sister, Tanya Wright, is an actress.

On January 5, 2013, Gregg Walker, Wright's former husband and then an executive at Sony, called Harlem's 30th Precinct to report that Wright had assaulted him. Wright was arrested. However, the charges were dropped the same night, and Walker was arrested because of a counter-claim made by Wright, which was allowed to stand. It is reported that Wright's family members contacted influential New Yorkers, including Reverend Calvin O. Butts, who subsequently contacted Phillip Banks III, NYPD Chief (who later resigned while under investigation) and his brother, Wright's current partner, David C. Banks, all of whom currently serve in the Adams administration. 

One day later on January 6, 2013, Wright was arrested again: this time for allegedly drilling through the lock on Walker’s 68-year-old mother’s door and attacking her, according to a criminal complaint filed by the Manhattan District Attorney’s office. Walker’s mother alleges that Wright slapped her in the face, scratched her arm, and pushed her.  Phillip Banks III admitted to contacting the 30th Precinct about Wright's arrest after being contacted by his brother, Wright's then-paramour David C. Banks.      

Wright's current partner, David C. Banks, serves as New York City Schools Chancellor in the Adams administration.

References 

1970 births
Living people
Deputy mayors of New York City
New York (state) Democrats
Nonprofit chief executives
George School alumni
Columbia College (New York) alumni
Columbia Law School alumni
People from the Bronx
American real estate businesspeople
Women in New York (state) politics